Messed Up Kids is a song featured on English indie rock artist Jake Bugg's second studio album Shangri La. The song is also the title track to an EP from that album, released on 12 May 2014, with three additional tracks recorded during the sessions for Shangri La. The song was also released as Digital Single and it has peaked at number 71 on the UK Singles Chart and number 67 in Belgium.

Track listing

References

Jake Bugg songs
2013 songs
Song recordings produced by Rick Rubin
Songs written by Jake Bugg
Songs written by Iain Archer
2014 singles
Virgin EMI Records singles